Ha-107 was an Imperial Japanese Navy Ha-101-class submarine. Completed and commissioned in December 1944, she served during the final months of World War II. She surrendered at the end of the war in September 1945 and was scuttled in April 1946.

Design and description

The Ha-101-class submarines were designed as small, cheap transport submarines to resupply isolated island garrisons. They displaced  surfaced and  submerged. They were designed to carry  of cargo.

For surface running, the boats were powered by a single  diesel engine that drove one propeller shaft. When submerged the propeller was driven by a  electric motor. They could reach  on the surface and  underwater. The boats were armed a single mount for a  Type 96 anti-aircraft gun.

Construction and commissioning

Ha-107 was laid down on 1 August 1944 by Mitsubishi at Kobe, Japan, as Small Supply Submarine No. 4607. She was launched on 20 December 1944 and was named Ha-107 that day. She was completed and commissioned on 7 February 1945.

Service history

Upon commissioning, Ha-107 was assigned to Submarine Squadron 11 for workups. She was reassigned to Submarine Division 33 in the Kure Submarine Squadron for training purposes on 20 March 1945.

Hostilities between Japan and the Allies ended on 15 August 1945, and on 2 September 1945, Ha-107 surrendered to the Allies at Maizuru, Japan. In November 1945, the U.S. Navy ordered Ha-107 to move to Sasebo, Japan.

Disposal
The Japanese struck Ha-107 from the Navy list on 30 November 1945.

Notes

References
 

 
 , History of Pacific War Extra, "Perfect guide, The submarines of the Imperial Japanese Forces", Gakken (Japan), March 2005, 
 Ships of the World special issue Vol.37, History of Japanese Submarines, (Japan), August 1993
 The Maru Special, Japanese Naval Vessels No.43 Japanese Submarines III, Ushio Shobō (Japan), September 1980, Book code 68343-43
 The Maru Special, Japanese Naval Vessels No.132 Japanese Submarines I "Revised edition", Ushio Shobō (Japan), February 1988, Book code 68344-36
 Senshi Sōsho Vol.88, Naval armaments and war preparation (2), "And after the outbreak of war", Asagumo Simbun (Japan), October 1975

Ha-101-class submarines
Ships built by Mitsubishi Heavy Industries
1944 ships
World War II submarines of Japan
Maritime incidents in 1946
Scuttled vessels
Shipwrecks in the Pacific Ocean
Shipwrecks of Japan